The 1934–35 Boston Bruins season was the Bruins' 11th season in the NHL.

Offseason

Regular season

Final standings

Record vs. opponents

Schedule and results

Playoffs
The Boston Bruins lost the Semi-Finals to the Toronto Maple Leafs 3–1.

Player statistics

Regular season
Scoring

Goaltending

Playoffs
Scoring

Goaltending

Awards and records

Transactions

See also
1934–35 NHL season

References

External links

Boston Bruins seasons
Boston
Boston
Boston Bruins
Boston Bruins
1930s in Boston